Shushrusha Citizens' Co-operative Hospital is located in Shivaji Park, Mumbai. It was founded in 1966 by Dr. V.S. Ranadive and is a hospital co-operative initiative.

Community services 
The hospital serves the community by providing no-cost services for prevention as well as treatment for physical and mental ailments. Projects include:

 Smile Train: Cleft lip, cleft palate and related deformities are treated at no charge to patients.
 Shushrusha is a member of the Federation of Bombay Blood Banks.
 Sakhi, sisterhood of strength, the clinic for Women.
 Swachh Bharat Abhiyan with the senior citizens group, the Center for the Study of Social change.

See also
 Consumers' cooperative
 List of hospitals in India

References

External links 

Hospital buildings completed in 1966
Hospitals in Mumbai
Hospitals established in 1966
1966 establishments in Maharashtra
20th-century architecture in India